Forest of Dean is a constituency in Gloucestershire represented in the House of Commons of the UK Parliament since 2005 by Mark Harper, a Conservative who has served as Secretary of State for Transport since 2022.

Boundaries 

1885–1918: The Sessional Divisions of Coleford, Lydney, Newent, and Newnham.

1918–1950: The Urban Districts of Awre, Coleford, Newnham, and Westbury-on-Severn, the Rural Districts of East Dean and United Parishes, Lydney, Newent, and West Dean, and part of the Rural District of Gloucester.

1997–2010: The District of Forest of Dean, and the Borough of Tewkesbury wards of Haw Bridge and Highnam.

2010–present: The District of Forest of Dean, and the Borough of Tewkesbury ward of Highnam with Haw Bridge. The constituency boundaries remained unchanged.

History 
This seat was created for the 1885 general election (replacing the two-seat constituency of West Gloucestershire under the Redistribution of Seats Act 1885), was redrawn for the 1918 general election, and abolished for the 1950 general election.  It was re-created, with different boundaries, for the 1997 general election, and has thus far not undergone any boundary changes.

Constituency profile 
The Forest of Dean constituency covers Gloucestershire west of the river Severn, and lies in the south west of England, near the Welsh border.

The core of the constituency consists of the Royal Forest of Dean itself, which was established by William the Conqueror nearly a thousand years ago and is one of the last surviving Royal Forests in England. The seat has a rich industrial and mining history, evidenced by the market towns of Coleford and Cinderford, and the old port of Lydney from where coal mined in the Forest of Dean Coalfield would start its journey to all parts of the world.

The Wye Valley forms the western border of the Forest and is an area of outstanding natural beauty, whilst the Leadon Valley forms the northern portion of the constituency. The Vale consists of countryside and farmland centred on the Tudor town of Newent, and also produces English wine.

The constituency also includes parishes from Tewkesbury district, including Forthampton, Chaceley Hole, Hasfield, Ashleworth and Highnam.

Members of Parliament

MPs 1885–1950

MPs since 1997

Elections

Elections in the 2010s

Elections in the 2000s

Election in the 1990s

Election in the 1940s

Elections in the 1930s

Elections in the 1920s

Election results 1885-1918

Elections in the 1910s

General Election 1914–15

A general election was due to take place by the end of 1915. By the autumn of 1914, the following candidates had been selected to contest that election. Due to the outbreak of war, the election never took place;
Liberal Party: Henry Webb
Labour Party: James Wignall

Elections in the 1900s

Elections in the 1890s

Elections in the 1880s

 Caused by Blake's resignation.

Notes

References

See also 
 List of parliamentary constituencies in Gloucestershire

Constituency
Parliamentary constituencies in South West England
Politics of Gloucestershire